Xanthorhoe orophylloides is a moth of the family Geometridae. It was first described by George Hudson in 1909 and is endemic to New Zealand. This species is found in the subantarctic islands including at the Auckland Islands and at Campbell Island.

Taxonomy
This species was first described by Hudson in 1909 using specimens collected at the North Arm of Carnley Harbour at the Auckland Islands and also at Campbell Island. In 1928 Hudson, in his seminal work The butterflies and moths of New Zealand, again discussed and illustrated this species. In 1971 J. S. Dugdale placed this species in the genus Helastia. The genus Helastia was restricted by R. C. Craw in 1987 placing this species into the genus Xanthorhoe. This placement was accepted in 1988 by Dugdale. The male holotype specimen, collected at Carnley Harbour, is held at Te Papa.

Description

Hudson described this species as follows:
X. orophylloides is similar in appearance to X. orophyla and Epyaxa rosearia but may be easily separated as X. orophylloides has narrower wings.

Distribution
This species is endemic to New Zealand. It is found in the subantarctic islands including at the Auckland Islands and at Campbell Island.

References 

Xanthorhoe
Moths of New Zealand
Moths described in 1909
Endemic fauna of New Zealand
Taxa named by George Hudson
Endemic moths of New Zealand